The Dollmaker is the name of several supervillains appearing in American comic books published by DC Comics.

Barton Mathis appeared in the second season of the Arrowverse series Arrow played by actor Michael Eklund and in the first season of Gotham played by Colm Feore (renamed as Dr. Francis Dulmacher).

Publication history
The Marcel Mannequin version of the Dollmaker first appeared in Plastic Man (vol. 2) #10, and was created by Arnold Drake and Jack Sparling.

The Anton Schott version of the Dollmaker first appeared in Supergirl (vol. 5) #58, and was created by Sterling Gates and Jamal Igle.

The Barton Mathis version of the Dollmaker first appeared in Detective Comics (vol. 2) #1, and was created by Tony S. Daniel.

Fictional character biography

Marcel Mannequin

The first character to use the name "the Dollmaker" was Marcel Mannequin, an extremely talented dollmaker who uses his own sentient mechanical dolls to commit crimes. He fought against Plastic Man at the time when he had previously given a blood transfusion to Gordon K. Trueblood. Plastic Man managed to defeat the Dollmaker at Madame DeLute's high society party.

Anton Schott

Anton Schott was the son of Winslow Percival Schott, a.k.a. the Toyman, and was born on Christmas Day. His father saw little interest in his son, whom he considered uninteresting, despite Anton showing great promises as a skilled toymaker. Anton's mother took him away on the belief that Winslow was a pedophile but only to abandon him, leaving him to fend for himself in Metropolis. Anton soon found his father's old workshop and decided to make a name for himself as the Dollmaker. Driven by abandonment issues, Anton started kidnapping other children and turning them into cybernetic doll-like slaves.

Anton later became obsessed with Daily Planet reporter Cat Grant, who was the mother of a victim killed by the Toyman, and planned on becoming her son. He sent a doll to Grant for every time a child was kidnapped by the Dollmaker. Grant, along with Supergirl, initially mistook the Toyman as being responsible for the missing children and confronted him at his incarceration in Arkham Asylum. They unwittingly brought one of the Dollmaker's dolls to his father, at which point it came to life and nearly killed the Toyman.

The Dollmaker soon personally confronted Grant and kidnapped her to his workshop. There, he told her of his origins and asked her to be his new mother. But Cat violently rejected him, infuriating Anton and causing him to decide on shutting down all his enslaved doll-children, which would kill them. However, Cat cried out for Supergirl's help, who immediately raided the Dollmaker's workshop and disarmed the dolls. Cat personally knocked out the Dollmaker and left him to be taken away by the authorities.

Barton Mathis

In September 2011, The New 52 rebooted DC's continuity. In this new timeline, Barton Mathis is introduced as a new "Dollmaker". As a child, Mathis went on several "hunting trips" with his father, Wesley. During these hunts, Mathis watched as his father killed people and then cannibalized them. He would also witness his father being shot down by a young cop named James Gordon. After spending only a year in foster care, Mathis disappeared for years before he resurfaced as the Dollmaker, a serial killer who creates "dolls" out of the skin and limbs of his victims, whose mask is partially made of skin from his deceased father. Despite the ambiguity surrounding his whereabouts, it would later be revealed that Barton Mathis sees the Toyman as a father figure, who was at one point a member of the Dollmaker "family".

The Dollmaker first appeared in current continuity during the Faces of Death storyline when he visited the Joker in Arkham Asylum. The Joker had planned to be caught and taken to Arkham for the sole purpose of having an audience with the Dollmaker. As planned, the Dollmaker cuts the skin from the Joker's face, leaving the madman ecstatic with the pain. That night they celebrated, believing themselves to be reborn. Upon tracking Ray Quimby, a serial killer associated with Wesley Mathis, to a location while believing Quimby kidnapped Commissioner James Gordon, Batman is ambushed by the members of the Dollmaker's "family" (members including Matilda Mathis, Bentley, Jack-in-the-Box, Sampson, Olivia Carr, and Orifice). Batman then encounters the Dollmaker, who has brought in what appears to be Commissioner Gordon.

As Batman crawls towards Commissioner Gordon, he discovers that the body is simply a "doll" of human body parts stitched together to resemble Commissioner Gordon. The Dollmaker announces his plans to make a doll of Batman's flesh and then sell it off to the highest bidder. Naturally, Batman resists and is forced to fight all of the Dollmaker's family with rapidly spreading paralysis in his body. With Jack-in-the-Box clinging to his back, Batman desperately leaps out a window to escape becoming too vulnerable in front of his enemy. Struggling to stand, he escapes while dragging the now-unconscious Jack-in-the-Box with him. At an abandoned hospital, a kidnapped Commissioner Gordon overhears his captor, the Dollmaker, explaining that he plans to remove his liver before beginning the doll process, because he must save a life before his can be taken. He expresses an interest in filming the procedure, as he has a personal vendetta against Gordon for killing his father. Commissioner Gordon is unaware of who the Dollmaker is talking about, but the Dollmaker tells Gordon that he is staring his own victim in the face - suggesting that the skin making up his new face actually belonged to Wesley Mathis. When Batman arrives at the hospital upon receiving a message from the Dollmaker, Batman hears the Dollmaker's voice and is attacked by Bentley, who chokes Batman into unconsciousness. When Batman awakens in a makeshift boxing ring, the Dollmaker then begins to auction Batman, who is hanging upside down near some Joker dolls.

Suspended like a marionette, Batman is forced to fight the Joker dolls when a crook named Raju arrives at the Dollmaker's lair to offer the Dollmaker a large sum of money in exchange for Batman. Raju's client is the Penguin, who plans to pay the Dollmaker some gold bars in exchange for Batman's body. The Dollmaker uses magnetized cables to immobilize Batman completely, and Batman is surprised to realize that the cables are of his own design, as the Dollmaker has somehow gained access to Wayne Corp. Regardless, he uses a demagnetizer in his suit to free himself, leaping forward and knocking the Penguin's thugs out. Freed, he easily defeats the Joker dolls and begins his search for the Commissioner. Meanwhile, the Dollmaker receives a call from an unseen benefactor, who warns him that the GCPD are on their way. The benefactor orders that Commissioner Gordon be killed. The Dollmaker and Matilda make their escape, while his thugs, Bentley and Sampson, gather all the organs and body parts they can salvage. Meanwhile, Batman begins kicking down every door in the hospital in search of Gordon. Batman defeats Bentley and Sampson and finds the Commissioner and Olivia Carr as they get to safety. Seeing the Dollmaker escaping in a car, Batman leaps down onto the roof, crushing it down around him. Unexpectedly though, the car explodes. When Batman investigates, he discovers that the car was filled with decoy dummies that he had mistaken to be the Dollmaker and that the real Dollmaker must have escaped in the police chopper.

During the Death of the Family storyline as Batman travels through the Joker-controlled Arkham Asylum, he discovers a twisted "royal tapestry" created for him as a "tribute from [his] faithful", made entirely of living bodies sewn together, kept alive via tubes in their stomachs. The Joker tells Batman that it was made "with a little help from the Dollmaker". The Dollmaker is later found by the Joker's Daughter, who asks him to sew the Joker's face onto her own and inject the Joker's blood into her veins. The Dollmaker follows through with her request. During the "Forever Evil" storyline, the Dollmaker is among the supervillains that are recruited by the Crime Syndicate of America to join the Secret Society of Super Villains.

Dollhouse

According to Matilda Mathis, she comes from a bloodline of supervillains, with Matilda serving as a successor to the Dollmaker (Barton Mathis) and the Dollmaker serving as a successor to his surrogate father, the Toyman. Prior to taking up the name "Dollhouse", Matilda had a doll mask grafted on top of her face and wore a nurse's outfit, killing her victims with a sledgehammer. Eventually, Matilda began to join her father in his organ trading business. When the Dollmaker kidnapped the Batman, though, the business started to go wrong. Following the events of the "Faces of Death" storyline, Matilda was forced to retreat and go into hiding with her father.

Some time after Batman's defeat of the Dollmaker family during the "Faces of Death" storyline, Matilda Mathis began to follow in the footsteps as her father, Barton Mathis, taking on the identity of "Dollhouse". As Dollhouse, Matilda adopted Barton Mathis' modus operandi as the Dollmaker. Dollhouse kidnapped homeless children, prostitutes and junkies of the streets of Gotham City and took them back to her facility. At her facility, Dollhouse would spend weeks nursing her kidnapping victims to their peak healthy condition before killing them and selling their organs for the Dollmaker's organ trade business. Dollhouse would then stuff the remainder of the corpses and turn them into human dolls, putting them on display in her garden.

As she continued to kidnap people off the streets, she drew the attention of Catwoman. Catwoman, who grew up on the streets of Gotham, took these kidnappings personally and began investigating them. In doing so, she ran into Dollhouse several times during her attempted kidnapping spree and, while she was able to save some of the potential victims, she failed to defeat Dollhouse during each encounter due to Dollhouse's heavy artillery and military grade weaponry. With the help of GCPD Detective Carlos Alvarez, Catwoman was eventually able to track down the location of Dollhouse's facility and, after a confrontation, Catwoman, Alvarez and Batman were able to free Dollhouse's remaining victims and end her kidnapping spree. Dollhouse managed to evade capture, however.

Skills and abilities
The first Dollmaker uses mechanical dolls that he can control.

The second Dollmaker is a talented inventor who can use sentient dolls as mobile weapons.

The third Dollmaker is a gifted surgeon known for creating dolls made of human flesh. He has enough skill to make them almost perfectly resemble specific living beings. Barton have some access to Wayne Enterprises technology and resources, as shown when he went against Batman.

In the Faces of Death story arc, Matilda is shown to be quite agile and in possession of a sledgehammer that she wields against her opponents. As Dollhouse, she uses heavy artillery and military grade weapons, such as grenades or machine guns. She is also somewhat a skilled surgeon.

In other media

Television

 An unrelated Dollmaker appears in the Super Friends: The Legendary Super Powers Show episode "The Case of the Dreadful Dolls", voiced by Frank Welker. This version uses voodoo dolls and hides out in Schott's Toy Factory. DVD commentary reveals that the show's producers created this incarnation of Dollmaker in lieu of the Toyman, who was not available to them.
 Barton Mathis appears in the Arrow episode "Broken Dolls", portrayed by Michael Eklund. This version is a serial killer who murders young girls by pouring polymer into their throats, which hardens and suffocates them, then dressing and posing the bodies like bisque dolls, which earned him the nickname "Dollmaker" from the police. Six years prior, he was apprehended by Detective Quentin Lance before breaking out of Iron Heights Penitentiary amidst the Undertaking during the season one finale with Count Vertigo's help. Determined to recapture him, Quentin joins forces with the Arrow. However, the former and his daughter Laurel Lance are kidnapped by Mathis, who intends to kill the latter and force Quentin to watch until the Canary kills Mathis for threatening her family.
 Barton Mathis, renamed Dr. Francis Dulmacher, appears in Gotham, portrayed by Colm Feore. This version is a "mad European scientist" who has conducted various experiments and found ways to revive the dead. Additionally, he operates a child-trafficking ring while using Trident Intercontinental Shipping as a front, kidnaps and imprisons people to use in his surgical experiments and sell their organs on the black market, and is based on a remote island off the European coast. After capturing Fish Mooney, she leads her fellow prisoners in a revolt against him, leading to Dulmacher being wounded and knocked out.

Film

An amalgamated incarnation of the Dollmaker appears in Batman vs. Robin, voiced by "Weird Al" Yankovic. This version is identified as Anton Schott, has elements of Barton Mathis, and wears a broken doll mask. Additionally, he was almost killed by his serial killer father as a child and is based in an abandoned toy factory in Gotham, where he kidnaps children and turns them into cyborgs so that they, according to him, can never be hurt again. Following a fight with Robin, who reluctantly spares him, Dollmaker is killed by Talon on the orders of the Court of Owls, who attempt frame Robin for it.

See also
 List of Batman family enemies
 List of Superman enemies
 Death of the Family

References

External links
 Dollmaker II at DC Comics Wiki
 Dollmaker III at DC Comics Wiki

Characters created by Arnold Drake
Characters created by Tony S. Daniel
Comics characters introduced in 1968
Comics characters introduced in 2011
DC Comics film characters
DC Comics male supervillains
DC Comics female supervillains
DC Comics orphans
DC Comics television characters
Fictional inventors
Fictional serial killers
Fictional surgeons